A baby boom is a period of high birth rate.

 Mid-20th century baby boom, often referred to as the Baby Boom
 Baby boomers, people born 1946-1964

Baby boom may also refer to:

 Baby Boom (film), 1987
 Baby Boom (American TV series), 1988
 Baby Boom (Singaporean TV series), 2003
 Baby Boom (Israeli TV series), 2014
 Babyboom (EP), 2006, Sonic Boom Six
 "Baby Boom" (song), by Magnus Uggla, 1989
 Baby Boom Galaxy, starburst galaxy
 Boom XB-1 ("Baby Boom"), a scaled-down supersonic demonstrator aircraft

See also
Boom baby, catchphrase of American basketball commentator Bobby Leonard